Siobhán McKenna (24 May 1922 – 16 November 1986) was an Irish stage and screen actress.

Background
She was born Siobhán Giollamhuire Nic Cionnaith in Belfast in the newly-created Northern Ireland into a Catholic and nationalist family. She grew up in Galway and in County Monaghan, speaking fluent Irish. Her father Eoghan McKenna (born Millstreet, County Cork, 1892) was Professor of Mathematics at University College, Galway (UCG). She was still in her teens when she became a member of an amateur Gaelic theatre group and made her stage debut at Galway's national Irish language theatre, An Taibhdhearc, in 1940.

Career
She is remembered for her English language performances at the Abbey Theatre in Dublin where she would eventually star in what many consider her finest role in the George Bernard Shaw play, Saint Joan.

While performing at the Abbey Theatre in the 1940s, she met actor Denis O'Dea, whom she married in 1946. Until 1970 they lived in Richmond Street South, Dublin. They had one child, a son: Donnacha O'Dea, who swam for Ireland at the 1968 Summer Olympics and later won a World Series of Poker bracelet in 1998.

In 1955 she created the role of Miss Madrigal in Enid Bagnold's The Chalk Garden on Broadway. In 1956, she appeared in the Cambridge Drama Festival production of Saint Joan at the Off-Broadway Phoenix Theatre. Theatre critic Elliot Norton called her performance the finest portrayal of Joan in memory. Siobhán McKenna's popularity earned her the cover of Life on 10 September 1956. In 1957, she joined the acting company of the Stratford Festival in Canada, playing Viola in Twelfth Night. She received a second Tony Best Actress nomination for her role in the 1958 play, The Rope Dancers, in which she starred with Art Carney and Joan Blondell.
Although primarily a stage actress, McKenna appeared in a number of made-for-television films and dramas. She also appeared in several motion pictures such as King of Kings in 1961, as Virgin Mary. In 1964, she performed in Of Human Bondage and the following year in Doctor Zhivago.
She also appeared in The Last Days of Pompeii, as Fortunata, wife of Gaius (Laurence Olivier).

In 1979 McKenna appeared in the title role of Roald Dahl's "The Landlady", an episode of the British TV series Tales of The Unexpected.

McKenna was awarded the Gold Medal of the Éire Society of Boston, for having "significantly fulfilled the ideals of the Éire Society, in particular, spreading awareness of the cultural achievements of the Irish people."

Death
Siobhán McKenna's final stage appearance came in the 1985 play Bailegangaire for the Druid Theatre Company. Despite surgery, she died of lung cancer the following year in Dublin, Ireland, at 64 years of age. Her body was buried at Rahoon Cemetery in County Galway. The inscription on the grave is in Irish.

In 1988, two years after her death, she was inducted into the American Theater Hall of Fame. The Siobhán McKenna Theatre, named in her honour, is in Cultúrlann McAdam Ó Fiaich in Belfast, the city of her birth.

The Siobhán McKenna Archive, documenting her life, is held in the Hardiman Library, NUI Galway.

Filmography

Film

Television

Recorded Audio

LP Records

 James Joyce - Ulysses (novel) : Soliloquies of Molly and Leopold Bloom (With E. G. Marshall). 1960. Caedmon Records TC 1068. (Side One : Molly Bloom (McKenna); SideTwo : Leopold Bloom (Marshall).

See also

 List of people on the postage stamps of Ireland

References

External links
 

Abbey Theatre
Stage actresses from Northern Ireland
Film actresses from Northern Ireland
Television actresses from Northern Ireland
Actresses from Belfast
Actresses from Galway (city)
Deaths from lung cancer in the Republic of Ireland
1986 deaths
Presidential appointees to the Council of State (Ireland)
Tradition Records artists
20th-century actresses from Northern Ireland
Irish nationalists
1922 births